Black Trash: The Autobiography of Kirk Jones is the debut solo studio album by Onyx member Sticky Fingaz, released on May 22, 2001, by Universal Records. Scripted like a movie, the concept album portrays the fictional character Kirk Jones, a felon just released from prison who is now struggling to come to terms with life outside jail.

Black Trash was produced by several producers including Self, Bud'da, Rockwilder, DJ Scratch, Nottz, Damon Elliott and others. It features guest appearances from Onyx's affiliate X1, Black Child, Raekwon, Still Livin, Canibus, Rah Digga, Redman, Dave Hollister, Petey Pablo, Eminem, Fredro Starr (as Firestarr), actor Omar Epps and others.

The album debuted at number 44 on the US Billboard 200, and number 10 on the Top R&B/Hip Hop Albums chart.

Background 
In 1998, Sticky Fingaz planned to release a solo album on Def Jam, but due to the label underfunding the project in Sticky's eyes, only offering him $250,000, he announced plans to leave the label and release the album elsewhere. He filed bankruptcy to get out of his Def Jam agreement and left for Los Angeles, California, where he began working with Dr. Dre. The first song he recorded in California was "Remember Me?", which was originally supposed to be on Dr. Dre's 2001 album, but was eventually released on Eminem's third album The Marshall Mathers LP. While working with Dr. Dre, the two came up with the idea of making an album scripted like a movie. Sticky originally planned to sign a solo deal with Dr. Dre's Aftermath Entertainment, but when he returned to New York to sign his friend X1 to Universal Records, he also received an offer from Universal after they listened to his new material. Universal gave him a proposal of $800,000 to record a solo album, which Sticky agreed to.

...They were like "X1 is dope, but we want to sign you". And they gave me a proposal for $800,000. Dre had gone to Jimmy Iovine and told him that I wanted a million dollars, but Jimmy Iovine said he would only give me $500,000. [I] always wonder what would have happened if I had signed with Dre instead of Universal. But that $300,000 difference was the money that I used to buy my mother the first house that she ever owned in her entire life, so I would never change that. - Sticky Fingaz

Recording and production 
Sticky Fingaz wrote the entirety of the album to be scripted like a movie, telling the story of Kirk Jones, a fictionalised version of himself who has recently been released from prison and struggles to adjust to live in the outside world. All guest verses were written by Sticky Fingaz with adjustments made by the guest artists accordingly, except for Canibus who wrote all of his verses from scratch.

Fred Durst of nu metal band Limp Bizkit was originally supposed to appear on the song "What If I Was White", but refused after reading the lyrics. After Durst refused, Sticky Fingaz proposed the track to Eminem, who also initially refused to provide a verse, but agreed to perform the intro and hook. The original solo version of "What If I Was White" was included on a 1998 mixtape Street Sweepers Pt. 4 by DJ Kay Slay and Dazon.

Heavy metal group Slipknot were supposed to be on the album, with two songs being recorded during production; "End Of The World" featuring lead singer Corey Taylor and "Oh My God", a song recorded in Slipknot's signature heavy metal style.

The original version of the song "Wonderful World" was much different than the version that made it on to the album. It was changed heavily after the estate of Louis Armstrong expressed their distaste for Sticky's altered lyrics, which referenced drugs and violence. In response, Sticky Fingaz wrote a detailed letter asking for the song to be used, and they granted him permission under the condition he could not change a single word from the original version.

The song "Just Do It", produced and featuring Dr. Dre was recorded especially for this album, but did not make the final cut. It eventually appeared on the soundtrack for the John Singleton film, Baby Boy.

Releases 
An advanced copy of "Black Trash" which consisted of 34 tracks was released in November 2000 and contained some minor differences compared to the official release. "What If I Was White" did not yet feature Eminem's vocals, and there are several skits that do not exist on the final release. This version also contains a number of different song titles than the official release, and features the original unedited version of "Wonderful World".

Universal Records pushed the release of the album back four times due to excessive bootlegging. The first release date was scheduled for Halloween 2000, but was later postponed to November 21, 2000, and was again pushed back to February 2001, before finally being released on May 22, 2001.

Also, in September 2000, Universal Records released a CD promo sampler Scenes From The Album Black Trash (The Autobiography Of Kirk Jones) with seven snippet tracks from the album up to that point.

In 2001, Universal Records released a 12" vinyl promo sampler Selections From The Album Blacktrash: The Autobiography Of Kirk Jones (Clean Versions) with clean versions of six tracks from the album.

Sticky Fingaz played live tracks from the "Black Trash" album only in April 2001, when he was on tour with Royce Da 5'9" and Nelly.

Critical response

Black Trash: The Autobiography of Kirk Jones was met with generally positive reviews from music critics. Matt Conaway of AllMusic gave the album three stars out of five, saying "...Scripted to fit the silver screen, Black Trash chronicles the trials and tribulations of Kirk Jones, a down-on-his-luck knucklehead who always manages to find trouble. However, it is hard to feel sympathetic for the character, as he is a man who, through the course of this LP, shows little regard for human life, kills his best friend, beats his wife, and deserts his child. Black Trash is an emotional roller coaster that tackles the quintessential tale of good vs. evil."

Johnny Blaze of Review Hip-Hop gave the album eighty nine out of hundred, and commented "...Black Trash stil to this day remains criminally underrated. Sticky show you can be thug and stil have a heart. Although it has been said a lot about concept albums you truly do feel as if your watching a movie with Black Trash. And like all good movies Black Trash is very creative throughout there really are lots of unique cuts on here. Once you finally get around to hearing you won't forget it, and fall in love with it."

J-23 of HipHopDX gave the album three and a half stars out of five, stating "...This album showed a lot more maturity than his Onyx showings. Sticky has the potential to be one of the best emcees in Hip Hop instead of just in gangsta rap."

Steve 'Flash' Juon of RapReviews gave the album eight and a half stars out of ten, and stated "...Despite the long delays, Sticky Fingaz' solo is INDEED worth the wait - and worth its weight in gold."

Neil Drumming of Vibe gave the album three and a half stars out of five, and wrote "...On his first solo album, an engaging fictional account of the life of an ex-con, Sticky finds balance between acting and rapping. Trash proves that Sticky Fingaz is a lot more thoughtful than he used to be. Even if he ain't mad anymore, at least he can still act like it."

Jermaine Hall of The Source gave the album four stars out of five, and commented "... This album, arguably hip-hop's most visual work of the new millenium, is a cinematic experience. Influenced by Hollywood's high-impact action scripts, Sticky puts together a 34-track production that stars Kirk Jones (his government name). And in spite of the lengthy player, Black Trash is a hip-hop treasure." (The Source Magazine, Issue #135 - December, 2000).

Kris Ex of Rolling Stone gave the album three stars out of five, and wrote "...[This] has some great moments....[It] manages to bring some new ideas and energy to the rap game." (Rolling Stone Magazine, Issue #862 - February 15, 2001, page 78).

Uncut gave the album four stars out of five, saying "...Kirk Jones' extraordinary LP merits reassessment: it runs the gamut from satiric outrage to gospel rapprochement..." (Uncut Magazine, Issue 51 - August 2001, page 112).

NME gave the album seven out of ten, and stated "...It had to happen. The frustrated actor/movie director within many a rapper couldn't be suppressed for much longer. Eventually, someone was going to come up with a grandiose, operatic, information-overload spectacle of a concept LP. And that's precisely what the former Onyx frontman Sticky Fingaz has done. All of which all adds up to magic realism, hip-hop style..." (NME Magazine, June 9, 2001, page 40).

Hao Nguyen of Stop The Break said "you're surprised at the level of depth and sincerity Sticky managed to muster."

Retrospect

Track listing

Personnel 
Credits for Blacktrash: The Autobiography of Kirk Jones adapted from AllMusic and CD booklet.

 Sticky Fingaz - performer/vocals/producer/executive producer/art direction/compiling/editing/sequencer/production manager
 Black Child - performer
 Raekwon - performer
 Still Livin - performer
 X1 - performer
 Canibus - performer
 Guess Who - performer
 Rah Digga - performer
 Redman - performer
 Scarred 4 Life - performer
 Superb - performer
 Dave Hollister - performer, vocals
 Petey Pablo - backing vocals
 Eminem - performer
 Choclatt - performer

 Firestarr - performer
 Columbo The Shining Star - performer
 Self - producer
 Rockwilder - producer
 DJ Scratch - producer
 Dominick "Nottz" Lamb - producer
 Buddah - producer
 Joe Naughty - producer
 Shamello - producer
 Chuckie Madness - producer
 Epitome - producer
 Fran Lover - producer
 Spyda Man - producer
 Damon Elliott - producer
 Big D Evans - producer
 Mike "Punch" Harper - producer
 Elaine Lee - A&R coordinator
 Dino Delvaille - A&R direction, executive producer

 Bento Design - art direction
 Sandy Brummels - art direction
 Tony Prendatt - compiling/editing/ mixing/sequencer/production manager
 Bento Design - design
 Andy Tavel Law Group - legal counsel
 Steve Lobel - management
 Mike Fossenkemper - mastering
 Ken "Duro" Ifill - mixing
 Brian Stanley - mixing
 Dave "Hard-Drive" Pensado - mixing
 Dave Guerrero - assistant mixing
 Rick Travali - mixing
 Tommy Uzzo - mixing
 John Eder - photographer
 Steve Eigner - engineer
 Omar Epps - voice actor

Leftover tracks 
 "What If I Was White" (original solo version) (1998)
 "End Of The World" (feat. Corey Taylor of Slipknot) (July 1999)
 "Oh My God" (feat. Corey Taylor of Slipknot) (original metal version) (July 1999)
 "What If I Was White" (without Eminem) (2000)
 "Wonderful World" (original dirty version) (2000)
 "Just Do It" (feat. Dr. Dre) (2000)

Charts

Weekly charts

Singles chart positions

References

External links 
 Black Trash: The Autobiography of Kirk Jones at RapGenius
 Black Trash: The Autobiography of Kirk Jones at Discogs
 

2001 albums
Sticky Fingaz albums
Universal Records albums
Albums produced by Rockwilder
Albums produced by Bud'da
Albums produced by Nottz
Albums produced by DJ Scratch
East Coast hip hop albums
Hardcore hip hop albums
Gangsta rap albums by American artists
Concept albums
Rap operas